The German Association for Mathematical Logic and for Basic Research in the Exact Sciences (German: Deutsche Vereinigung für mathematische Logik und für Grundlagenforschung der exakten Wissenschaften; DVMLG) is the learned society representing the interdisciplinary research area of Logic
(within the disciplines of Mathematics, Philosophy, Computer Science, and Linguistics) in German-speaking countries. It was founded in 1962 by Wilhelm Ackermann, Gisbert Hasenjaeger, Hans Hermes, Jürgen von Kempski, Paul Lorenzen, Arnold Schmidt, and Kurt Schütte. Its members are researchers in Mathematical Logic, Philosophical Logic, and Theoretical Computer Science. Biannually, the DVMLG organises the Colloquium Logicum, an international research conference in logic.
The DVMLG forms the National Committee for Logic, Methodology and Philosophy of Science representing the Ordinary Member Germany within the 
Division of Logic, Methodology and Philosophy of Science and Technology (DLMPST).

Governance
The current President of the DVMLG is Katrin Tent (since 2022). The Board consists of the President and five other members: 
Matthias Aschenbrenner (Vice President; stellvertretende Vorsitzende), Manuel Bodirsky, Leon Horsten, Benedikt Löwe, Heike Mildenberger.

Past Presidents

Past Board members
The following persons were among the members of the DVMLG Board in the past:
Wilhelm Ackermann (1962),
Matthias Aschenbrenner (since 2021; Vice President since 2022),
Gisbert Hasenjaeger (1962–1970), 
Hans Hermes (1962–1972; President 1967–1970),
Paul Lorenzen (1962–1972),
Kurt Schütte (1962–1971),
Arnold Oberschelp (1965–1979; President 1970–1976),
Wolfgang Stegmüller (1965–1969),
Ernst Specker (1970–1977),
Heinz-Dieter Ebbinghaus (1972–1981),
Anne Troelstra (1977–2000),
Michael M. Richter (1981–1986; President 1981–1985),
Johann Makowsky (1998–2010),
Ulrich Kohlenbach (2006–2012; Vice President 2006–2008; President 2008–2012),
Benedikt Löwe (seit 2006; Vice President 2008–2012; President 2012-2022),
Sy David Friedman (2012–2014),
Katrin Tent (since 2012; Vice President 2016-2022; President since 2022).

Activities
The DVMLG organises a biannual conference called Colloquium Logicum. Since 2002, there is a PhD Colloquium organised as part of the Colloquium Logicum where excellent
doctoral dissertations in logic are presented (based on nominations by the membership of the DVMLG). Past Colloquia Logica took place in 
Kiel (1988),
Bielefeld (1990),
Münster (1992),
Neuseddin (1994),
Berlin (1998),
Dresden (2000),
Münster (2002),
Heidelberg (2004),
Bonn (2006),
Darmstadt (2008),
Münster (2010),
Paderborn (2012),
Neubiberg (2014),
Hamburg (2016), 
Bayreuth (2018), and
Konstanz (2022). 
Colloquium Logicum 2012 was part of the German activities of the Alan Turing Year, celebrating the centenary of Alan Turing. As part of these celebrations, the DVMLG organised a theatre tour of the University Players Hamburg performing Hugh Whitemore's play Breaking the Code in Germany and the Netherlands.
The Colloquium Logicum in Konstanz was scheduled for September 2020, but was postponed to for two years due to the COVID-19 pandemic.

Together with the German Mathematical Society (DMV), the DVMLG organises the Fachgruppe Mathematische Logik (Section Mathematical Logic).
The DVMLG has a publication agreement with the scientific publishing house Wiley and has been responsible for the scientific management of the journal Mathematical Logic Quarterly since 2011.

References

External links

1962 establishments in Germany
Education in Germany
Learned societies of Germany